Carriers of Dust is the second studio album by the one man symphonic black metal band Mirrorthrone.

Track listing
 "A Scream to Express the Hate of a Race" – 9:22
 "Mortphose" – 4:49
 "De l'Échec Et De Son Essentialité [Point 1. Marginalité Démystifiée]" – 10:22
 "Ils Brandiront leurs Idoles" – 22:10

Credits
Vladimir Cochet - Vocals, Guitars, Bass, Synthesizer & drum programming.

References

External links
Official website

2006 albums
Mirrorthrone albums